Sapieha Palace is a High Baroque palace in Sapiegos str., Antakalnis district of Vilnius, Lithuania. It is the only surviving of several palaces formerly belonging to the Sapieha family in the city. The palace is surrounded by the remains of the 17th-century formal park, with parterres, ponds, and avenues. The impressive Baroque gate secures the entrance to the park from Antakalnis street and the other gate is on the opposite side of the park, near the palace. Both of them were restored in 2012.

History 
The palace, ordered by Great Hetman of Lithuania Jan Kazimierz Sapieha the Younger was built in Baroque style in 1691–1697 in place of the former wooden mansion of Lew Sapieha (who died here in 1633). The palace was designed by Giovanni Pietro Perti and decorated with frescos by Michelangelo Palloni. The piano nobile has initially displayed Dutch tiles and mosaics representing blazons, churches, castles, and palaces owned or built by the Sapiehas. Originally, the palace had multi-floor arcades on its sides, which were later built up to gain more space inside the building. Jan Kazimierz Sapieha the Younger by building the luxurious Sapieha Palace ensemble wished to surpass the John III Sobieski projects and to show his power and ability to be a Grand Duke of Lithuania and King of Poland.

19th century 
In 1809 the palace was acquired by the Russian government and restructured (according to Józef Poussier's design) into a military hospital in 1843. Much of the rich interior was destroyed throughout the 19th century.

20th century 
The exterior of the palace was restored only in 1927-1928 and the building housed University's ophthalmology institute until World War II. Since the war, it has been used as a military hospital again and fell into disrepair.

21st century 
In the early years of the century the complex housed the Sapieha Hospital.

Since 2012, the palace has been undergoing restoration, in an attempt to bring it as close as possible to its original Baroque appearance.

See also
 Sapieha Palace, Warsaw
 Slushko Palace

References

External links
Pictures of the ensemble

Palaces in Vilnius
Houses completed in 1697
1697 establishments in the Polish–Lithuanian Commonwealth
Baroque palaces in Lithuania